Universal Helicopters  was a commercial helicopter company located in Newfoundland and Labrador, Canada. While operating primarily in Newfoundland and Labrador with operations sometimes extending into the Ungava Peninsula and the Arctic, Universal Helicopters held an International Operating Certificate and completed several contracts in Greenland.

History
The company started operations in 1963 and was a subsidiary of Okanagan Helicopters. It was last owned by a partnership of companies formed by Nunatsiavut Group of Companies, Tasiujatsoak Trust and CAPE Fund.

On September 10, 2018 the company announced it had finalized the purchase of Lakelse Air, as part of plan to double their revenue. Based in Northwest British Columbia, Lakelse Air had been seen as a strategic purchase to build and strengthen Indigenous relations across Canada for future job prospects. Shortly after acquiring Lakelse Air, Universal Helicopters began shifting its focus to work internationally and overseas. Pushing for Global growth along with their September 6, 2018 investment in South Coast Helicopters proved to be unsustainable, leading to their eventual financial difficulty.

The company announced its sudden closure due to financial insolvency on May 27, 2020.

Bases
Universal Helicopters corporate head office, main stores and accounting services were situated in Goose Bay, Labrador with other bases situated at St. John's, Pasadena and Gander. Each location had permanent base personnel and hangar support facilities for year-round operations and maintenance.

Fleet
Universal Helicopters had the following aircraft registered with Transport Canada:

The Transport Canada list also shows that they once had a Bell 407.

Customer reception
The Government of Newfoundland and Labrador had had extensive contracts with the company, using them for medical evacuation, clinic support, forest fire surveillance and suppression, aerial searching, survey and mapping and personnel transport.

See also
History of aviation in Canada
List of defunct airlines of Canada

References

External links

Universal Helicopters

Helicopter airlines
Regional airlines of Atlantic Canada
Defunct companies of Newfoundland and Labrador
Helicopter operators
Defunct airlines of Canada
Companies based in St. John's, Newfoundland and Labrador
Airlines established in 1963
Airlines disestablished in 2020